Annunciation is a 1614 painting by El Greco, now in the Diocesan Museum in Sigüenza, Spain. One of his last works, he probably produced it in collaboration with his son Jorge Manuel.

Bibliography
 ÁLVAREZ LOPERA, José, El Greco, Madrid, Arlanza, 2005, Biblioteca «Descubrir el Arte», (colección «Grandes maestros»). .
 SCHOLZ-HÄNSEL, Michael, El Greco, Colonia, Taschen, 2003. .
 https://web.archive.org/web/20100918082057/http://www.artehistoria.jcyl.es/genios/cuadros/6416.htm

El Greco
Paintings by El Greco
1614 paintings